Tzabari (Hebrew: צברי) is a Jewish surname. People with the surname include:

 Pinhas Tzabari (born 1956), Israeli politician 
 Rachel Tzabari (1909–1995), Israeli politician 
 Simha Tzabari (1913–2004), Israeli politician

Jewish surnames